Melora is a monotypic moth genus in the subfamily Arctiinae. Its single species, Melora amygdaloides, is found in Brazil. Both the genus and species were first described by Francis Walker in 1855.

References

Arctiinae
Monotypic moth genera
Moths of South America